William Sol Benson (August 24, 1877 in Kyiv, Russian Empire – October 21, 1945) was an Esperantist.

Benson emigrated from the Russian Empire to the United States in 1889. He was an osteopathic physician in Newark, New Jersey. He was also the author of an original method for teaching Esperanto using pictures and the owner of Benson's School of Esperanto. He authored 10 Kajerojn de Universala Esperantigilo (1925–1927) and Bensona Universala Esperanto-Metodo (1932). Benson was a member of American Academy of Esperanto (Amerika Esperanto-Akademio) in the 1940s.

Works
Benson School of Esperanto (22 p.)
Dr. Benson's personal mail course practical Esperanto
Universala Esperantistigilo  (1925)
Universala Esperanto-metodo (1932)
Practical Esperanto by Dr. Benson (1925–1932)
Universala propagandilo: specimena leciono (1928, 22 p., ilustr.)

References

External links
Universala Esperanto-Metodo (rescanned) in Esperanto
 in Esperanto
Universala Esperanto-Metodo (WWW version) in Esperanto

American Esperantists
1877 births
Physicians from Kyiv
1945 deaths
Emigrants from the Russian Empire to the United States